Bharat Operating System Solutions (BOSS GNU/Linux) is an Indian Linux distribution derived from Debian. BOSS Linux was released in four editions:

 BOSS Desktop (for personal use, home and office)
 EduBOSS (for schools and the education community)
 BOSS Advanced Server and BOSS MOOL

The latest stable version is 9.0 ("Urja").

Development 
BOSS Linux was developed by the Centre for Development of Advanced Computing (C-DAC) to enhance the usage of Free and Open Source Software throughout India. It is a crucial deliverable of the National Resource Centre for Free and Open Source Software (NRC-FOSS). It has an enhanced desktop environment integrated with Indian language support and other software.

The software has been endorsed by the Government of India for adoption and implementation on a national scale. BOSS Linux has been certified by the Linux Foundation for compliance with the Linux Standard Base (LSB) standard. It supports Intel and AMD IA-32/x86-64 architecture till version 6. From version 7, the development shifted to x86-64 architecture only.

Version history 

BOSS Linux has nine major releases:

BOSS 5.0 (Anokha) 
This release came with many new applications mainly focused on enhanced security and user-friendliness. The distribution includes over 12,800 new packages, for a total of over  packages. Most of the software in the distribution has been updated: over  software packages (70% of all packages in Savir). BOSS 5.0 supports Linux Standard Base (LSB) version 4.1. The new version features XBMC to allow users to easily browse and view videos, photos, podcasts, and music from a hard drive, optical disc, local network, and the internet.

BOSS 6.0 (Anoop)
There are several significant updates in BOSS Linux 6.0 (Anoop) from 5.0 (Anokha). Notable changes include a kernel update from 3.10 to 3.16, a shift for system boot from init to systemd, the full support of GNOME Shell as part of GNOME 3.14, an update to the GRUB version, Iceweasel being replaced by Firefox and Pidgin replacing Empathy, and several repository versions of available programs being updated as part of the release.

BOSS Linux 6.0 also shipped various application and program updates, such as LibreOffice, X.Org, Evolution, GIMP, VLC media player, GTK+, GCC, GNOME Keyring, and Python.

Related specifically to the localization support, language support got even better with the replacement of SCIM with IBus with the Integrated System Settings. Now Indic languages enabled with ″Region and Languages″ are directly mapped to the IBus, and the OnScreenKeyboard layout is provided for all layouts.

This release is fully compatible with LSB 4.1.

BOSS 7.0 (Drishti) 
The most significant change over previous releases is that support for the x86 version has been dropped, and now it is only available for x86-64. Other noticeable changes include a linux kernel update to 4.9.0, a GNOME update from 3.14 to 3.22, and software updates to various applications and programs with wide Indian language support & packages. This release aims to enhance the user interface with more glossy themes and is coupled with the latest applications from the community.

BOSS 8.0 (Unnati) 
Desktop Environment is changed from GNOME to Cinnamon.

BOSS 9.0 (Urja) 
Linux kernel updated from 5.2 to 5.10.

See also

 Debian
 Comparison of Linux distributions
 Free culture movement
 Simputer

References

External links

 
 

2007 software
Debian-based distributions
Language-specific Linux distributions
Operating system distributions bootable from read-only media
X86-64 Linux distributions
Indic computing
Urdu-language computing
State-sponsored Linux distributions
Linux distributions